In organic chemistry, peri-naphthalenes are particular derivatives of naphthalene with the formula C10H6-1,8-X2.  Owing to the rigidity of the naphthalene skeleton, these substituents on the 1- and 8-positions are constrained to be relatively close 2.5 Å, which is within the van der Waals radius for many atoms.  In contrast, ortho-substituents pendant from a benzene ring are separated by about 3.3 Å.

Examples
Because of this unusual structural feature, many unusual compounds are derived from peri-naphthalenes.  One example is 1,8-bis(dimethylamino)naphthalene, known as proton sponge because of its high affinity for protons.  Its ammonium derivative has a pKa of 12.7. The compound 1,8-bis(dimethylboryl)naphthalene is known as hydride sponge because of its high affinity for hydride. It solubilizes potassium hydride. Other distinctive compounds include the diphosphine 1,8-bis(diphenylphosphino)naphthalene (dppn) and the disulfide, both of which are ligand precursors.

Synthesis
Several peri-naphthalenes are prepared via nitrations. Dinitration of naphthalene gives 1,8-dinitronaphthalene, which undergoes hydrogenation to the diamine.  The diamine can also be produced by reaction of the 1,8-diol with ammonia at high temperatures. The peri-naphthalene 1-amino-naphthalene-8-sulfonic acid is a precursor to other peri-naphthalenes. It is prepared by nitration of naphthalene-1-sulfonic acid followed by reduction. Diazotization followed by loss of N2 gives the naphthosultone.  This species reacts with NaOH to give sequentially 1-hydroxynaphthalene-8-sulfonic acid and then the 1,8-diol.

Certain perinaphthalene derivatives can be prepared from 1,8-dilithionaphthalene, which in turn is generated by dilithiation of 1-bromonaphthalene:
C10H7Br  +  BuLi   →    C10H7Li  +  BuBr
C10H7Li  +  BuLi   →    C10H6Li2  +  BuH
The deprotonation requires tmeda.

References

Naphthalenes